Aksharathettu is a 1989 Malayalam film directed by I. V. Sasi, starring Suresh Gopi, Mukesh, Jagathy Sreekumar, Urvasi and Sudha, often cited as the first solo hit of actor Suresh Gopi.

The movie is a remake of the American film Fatal Attraction, starring Michael Douglas and Glenn Close. The film was remade in Telugu language by I.V.Sasi himself as Manchivaru Maavaru, starring Dr. Rajasekhar, Jeevitha and Leena Nair.

Plot

The film features the story of three bank employees and their wives. Bank manager Prakash (Suresh Gopi) is an ideal husband, while his wife Sumati (Urvasi) is emotional and complaining. They have a perfect family with a smart boy, a terraced house and a Maruti car. Accountant James (Mukesh) is a womanizer and his wife Elsi (Lizy) is fed up with his activities. Cashier Gowthaman (Jagathy Sreekumar) is struggling to adjust with his North Indian, Hindi-speaking wife Ambika as he has to take care of all the household chores and look after their baby. There is a tangential story line involving a suspicious husband named Thankappan (Kuthiravattam Pappu) and Radha, a servant in Prakash's home.

Then enters Renuka Menon (Sudha), a beautiful widow who arrives at the bank to open an account and gets charmed by the handsome Prakash. Sumati leaves for her parents' (Jagannatha Varma and Kaviyoor Ponnamma) house to celebrate her father's birthday, while Prakash is busy with a visit by the regional manager (Janardhanan) at the bank. That night after the party, it rains heavily. Prakash's car gets stuck in the middle of the road. Prakash tries to open the bonnet of the car. Renuka comes in her car, gives a lift and arrives at Renuka's house. Prakash  has a fever. Renuka gives an alcoholic beverage for Prakash, who is shivering due to fever and the cold. Renuka has sexy videos for Prakash. Prakash goes to bed feeling tired, but Renuka enters and has sex with Prakash. Next day, Prakash goes away telling Renuka that it is wrong for him as he has a family and he never wants any type of relationship with Renuka. But Renuka is deeply in love with Prakash, so she goes to the bank daily to meet Prakash, but Prakash hides. Then Renuka tries to keep calling Prakash, who tries to disconnect the call. Prakash gets tense finally seeing Renuka come to his house and gives a saree and chocolate to his Sumati and son. Sumati asks Prakash the reason, for which Prakash tells her he accidentally committed a sin.

Sumati gets angry and leave the house without hearing the full story circumstances. Sumati's mother tells Sumati that her father committed more sin, so Prakash needs to be forgiven for having an accidental sin. Thus Sumati comes back and again starts life with Prakash. Now Renuka gets more angry and kills all the pet animals of Prakash's house when they all go for a picnic. Sumati goes to Renuka and tells her if she plays again, she will be cut into pieces. Now Renuka tries kidnap Prakash's son, who escapes somehow. Sumati, in the process of finding the son, meets with an accident as her car hit a lorry. For this, Prakash goes to Renuka's house, has a fight and finally beats the mad-minded Renuka. Sumati is discharged from hospital. Next night, rain again falls heavily. A gate turning noise is heard, Sumati opens the door, now Renuka attack Sumati and tries to kill her, leading to a fight. Finally, the son hits Renuka head with a stone and kills her. Thus ends the story.

Cast

Suresh Gopi as Prakash
Urvasi as Sumathi Prakash 
Sudha as Renuka Menon
Jagathy Sreekumar as Gouthaman
Mukesh as James
Lizy as Elsy James 
Kuthiravattom Pappu as Thankappan
Janardhanan
Jagannatha Varma
Kaviyoor Ponnamma

Soundtrack

The film contains a hit song, "Hridayam Kondezhuthiya Kavitha", composed by Shyam. Lyrics were by Sreekumaran Thampi.

References

External links
 

1989 films
1980s Malayalam-language films
Films directed by I. V. Sasi